Confederates in the Attic  (1998) is a work of non-fiction by Pulitzer Prize-winning author Tony Horwitz.  Horwitz explores his deep interest  in the American Civil War and investigates the ties in the United States among citizens to a war that ended more than 130 years previously. He reports on attitudes on the Civil War and how it is discussed and taught, as well as attitudes about race.

Among the experiences Horwitz has in the book:
 Horwitz's first day with reenactors, led by Robert Lee Hodge, a particularly hardcore reenactor (who is featured in a photo on the cover of the book). He is a waiter.
 Lee-Jackson Day in North Carolina
 Touring Charleston, South Carolina, including Fort Sumter National Monument
 Studying a Union soldier on a monument celebrating Confederates in Kingstree, South Carolina
 The aftermath of the murder of Michael Westerman, a Todd County, Kentucky man murdered by a gunshot fired from a car containing black teenagers, for having a Confederate flag on the back of his pickup truck
 A reenactment of the Battle of the Wilderness in Virginia
 A visit with the historian and novelist Shelby Foote, author of The Civil War: A Narrative (1958, 1963, 1974). He had become more widely known after appearing in Ken Burns's Civil War documentary
 Visiting Shiloh National Military Park during the anniversary of the battle.
 Exploring the "truth" about Gone with the Wind
 Visiting Andersonville National Historic Site, where prisoners of war were held
 Visiting Fitzgerald, Georgia, a town founded by union veterans in Georgia which became notable for reconciliation between Union and Confederate veterans
 Touring Vicksburg, Mississippi
 Going on Robert Hodge's "Civil Wargasm", a week-long journey to various battle sites in Virginia and Maryland, remaining in authentic uniform and sleeping on the battlefields
 An off-and-on chat with Alberta Martin, believed at the time to be the last surviving widow of a Confederate soldier.
 Confederate heritage in Selma, Alabama

When published, Confederates in the Attic became a bestseller in the United States. The New York Times described it as intellectually honest and humorous, saying Horwitz seemed uncomfortable placed between two sides, seeking peace between the factions.

Toward the end of the chapter on Alberta Martin, Horwitz claims that Martin's Confederate husband was a deserter.  In response, in 1998 the Southern Legal Resource Center sued Horwitz on Martin's behalf, with encouragement from the Sons of Confederate Veterans. It noted that two other William Martins were on the rolls of the same company as Alberta's husband.  In addition, the SLRC claimed that Horwitz had ridiculed her in his book.

In 2000 the University of North Carolina's Chapel Hill campus added Confederates in the Attic to its freshman reading list.

References

External links
 Tonyhorwitz.com
Presentation by Horwitz on Confederates in the Attic, October 10, 1998
Presentation by Horwitz on Confederates in the Attic, July 3, 1999

1998 non-fiction books
History books about the American Civil War
American history books